Highland Lake may refer to:

Bodies of water
 Highland Lake (Winchester, Connecticut)
 Highland Lake (Illinois)
 Highland Lake (Bridgton, Maine)
 Highland Lake (Presumpscot River), in Windham, Maine
 Highland Lake (Columbia Heights, Minnesota)
 Highland Lake (Stoddard, New Hampshire)
 Highland Lake (Warren Center, Pennsylvania)

Places
 Highland Lake, Alabama
 Highland Lakes, New Jersey
 Highlandlake, Colorado

See also
 Highland Lakes (disambiguation)